The Chicago International Film Festival is an annual film festival held every fall. Founded in 1964 by Michael Kutza, it is the longest-running competitive film festival in North America. Its logo is a stark, black and white close up of the composite eyes of early film actresses Theda Bara, Pola Negri and Mae Murray, set as repeated frames in a strip of film.

In 2010, the 46th Chicago International Film Festival presented 150 films from more than 50 countries. The Festival's program is composed of many different sections, including the International Competition, New Directors Competition, Docufest, Black Perspectives, Cinema of the Americas, and Reel Women.

Its main venue is the AMC River East 21 Theatre in the Streeterville neighborhood of Chicago.

International Connections Program
The International Connections Program was created in 2003 in order to raise awareness of the international film culture and diversity of Chicago, and to make the festival more appealing to audience and staff of various ethnicities. Foreign films are screened for free throughout the city weekly from July through September.

Awards
Winners are awarded Hugo Awards in eight different competition categories.
International Feature Film Competition
Gold Hugo
Silver Hugo: Jury Prize
Silver Hugo: Best Director
Silver Hugo: Best Actor (until 2019)
Silver Hugo: Best Actress (until 2019)
Silver Hugo: Best Performance (from 2020)
Silver Hugo: Best Ensemble Performance
Silver Hugo: Best Cinematography
Silver Hugo: Best Screenplay
Silver Hugo: Best Sound
Silver Hugo: Best Art Direction
New Directors Competition

International Documentary Competition

Out-Look Competition

City & State Competition
Chicago Award
Live Action Short Film Competition

Documentary Short Film Competition

Animated Short Film Competition

Gold Hugo

Silver Hugo

Jury Award
 2022 – Close, dir. Lukas Dhont (Belgium)
 2021 – Drive My Car, dir. Ryusuke Hamaguchi (Japan)
 2020 – Careless Crime, dir. Shahram Mokri (Iran)
 2019 – Vitalina Varela, dir. Pedro Costa (Portugal)

Best Director
 2022 – Maryam Touzani (Morocco) for The Blue Caftan
 2021 – Peter Kerekes (Slovakia) for 107 Mothers
 2020 – Andrei Konchalovsky (Russia) for Dear Comrades!
 2019 – Maya Da-Rin (Brazil) for The Fever

Best Actor
 2021 – Bouli Lanners (Belgium) for Nobody Has to Know
 2019 – Bartosz Bielenia (Poland) for Corpus Christi
 2018 – Jesper Christensen (Denmark) for Before the Frost
 2017 – Aleksandr Yatsenko (Russia) for Arrhythmia
 2016 – Adrian Titieni (Romania) for Graduation
 2015 – Alexi Mathieu and Jules Gauzelin (France) for A Childhood
 2014 – Anton Yelchin (USA) for Rudderless
 2013 – Robert Wieckiewicz (Poland) for Walesa: Man of Hope
 2012 – Denis Lavant (France) for Holy Motors
 2011 – Maged El Kedwany (Egypt) for 678
 2010 – Youssouf Djaoro (Chad) for A Screaming Man
 2009 – Filippo Timi (Italy) for Vincere
 2008 – Michael Fassbender (Ireland) for Hunger
 2007 – Sam Riley (United Kingdom) for Control
 2006 – Jürgen Vogel (Germany) for The Free Will
 1989 – Jörg Gudzuhn (GDR) for Fallada, letztes Kapitel
 1987 – Avtandil Makharadze (Georgia) for Monanieba
 1971 – Ezzatollah Entezami (Iran) for The Cow

Best Actress

 2021 – Michelle Fairley (Ireland) for Nobody Has to Know
 2019 – Debbie Honeywood (UK) for Sorry We Missed You
 2018 – Zhao Tao (China) for Ash Is Purest White
 2017 – Jowita Budnik (Poland) and Eliane Umuhire (Rwanda) for Birds Are Singing in Kigali
 2016 – Rebecca Hall (UK) for Christine
 2015 – Lizzie Brocheré (France) for Full Contact
 2014 – Geraldine Chaplin (United States) for Sand Dollars
 2013 – Nadeshda Brennicke (Germany) for 
 2012 – Ulla Skoog (Sweden) for The Last Sentence
 2011 – Olivia Colman (UK) for Tyrannosaur
 2010 – Liana Liberato (USA) for Trust
 2009 – Giovanna Mezzogiorno (Italy) for Vincere
 2008 – Preity Zinta (India) for Heaven on Earth
 2007 – Yu Nan (China) for Tuya's Marriage
 2006 – Viktoriya Isakova, Darya Moroz, Anna Ukolova (Russia) for The Spot
 2005 – Inka Friedrich, Nadja Uhl (Germany) for Summer in Berlin
 2003 – Ludivine Sagnier (France) for Little Lili

Best Performance
 2022 – Vicky Krieps (Luxembourg) for Corsage
 2020 – Yakusho Koji (Japan) for Under the Open Sky

Best Cinematography
 2022 – Maria von Hausswolff (Iceland) for Godland
 2021 – Kasper Tuxen (Denmark) for The Worst Person in the World
 2020 – Tobie Marier Robitaille (Canada) for Night of the Kings
 2019 – Vladimír Smutný (Czech Republic) for The Painted Bird

Best Screenplay
 2022 – Alice Diop, Amrita David, and Marie NDiaye (France) for Saint Omer
 2021 – Alexandre Koberidze (Georgia) for What Do We See When We Look at the Sky?
 2020 – Christos Nikou and Stavros Raptis (Greece) for Apples
 2019 – Pema Tseden (China) for Balloon

Best Art Direction
 2022 – Marcela Gómez and Daniel Rincon (Colombia) for The Kings of the World
 2021 – Sergey Fevralev (Russia) for Captain Volkonogov Escaped
 2020 – Jagna Dobesz (Poland) for Sweat

Lifetime Achievement Awards
Winners of the festival's Lifetime Achievement Award include Steven Spielberg, Helen Hunt, Dustin Hoffman, Martin Landau, Shirley MacLaine, Lord Richard Attenborough, François Truffaut, Jodie Foster, Sigourney Weaver, Robin Williams, Manoel de Oliveira, and Clint Eastwood.

Career Achievement Awards
Bruce Dern (2013)
Terrence Howard (2005)
Susan Sarandon (2005)
Shirley MacLaine (2005)
Robert Zemeckis (2004)
Irma P. Hall, Robert Townsend and Harry J. Lennix (2004)
Annette Bening (2004)
Robin Williams (2004)
Nicolas Cage (2003)

Television awards

The Television Awards started with the idea of honoring television commercials in a special event of the film festival, but over time evolved and grew into a bigger event, comprising not only commercials but also television productions, series, and online television. In 2003 a separate ceremony was launched for the TV awards, and in 2017, the event became a separate event, named the Chicago International Television Festival. Winners and runners-up for the various categories, which include Gold and Silver Hugos, are listed on the film festival website.

See also
 Chicago International Children's Film Festival
 Chicago International Documentary Film Festival
 Chicago International REEL Shorts Festival
Chicago Underground Film Festival
 List of film festivals

References

External links
 Chicago International Film Festival

Film festivals in Chicago
Lifetime achievement awards
Film festivals established in 1964